The Lake Placid 2023 FISU World University Games, commonly known as Lake Placid 2023, was an collegiate multi-sport winter sports  held between January 12 to January 22, 2023 and had Lake Placid, New York, United States as main host city. Alongside Lake Placid, events were also hosted by neighbouring cites of Wilmington, Saranac Lake and Potsdam also located at the New York state.  The event is also known as the 31st Winter Universiade as administered by the International University Sports Federation (FISU).

It marked the second edition of the Games, formerly known as the Winter Universiade, to be held in Lake Placid, after the 1972 games. It was the third time that the World University Games were held in the United States after Lake Placid in 1972 and 1993 Summer Universiade in Buffalo also in the state of New York.

Host selection and preparation
The FISU, led by director Milan Augustin, inspected the Lake Placid area in June 2017, as well as nearby town of Wilmington that was a support city for the activities of the Games. Lake Placid was officially announced as the host city on March 5, 2018; the bid was called one of the strongest in the history of Universiades by FISU officials.

As the 2021 Winter Universiade was cancelled due to the COVID-19 pandemic in Switzerland, the formal handover to Lake Placid was instead held at a ceremony in Turin in January 2022. A launch event was held at Lake Placid's Mid's Park on January 23, 2022.

The games are expected to cost $83 million.

Sports
The Games are scheduled to feature 85 medal events in 12 sports.Is the highest number of the events held in a World World University Games edition in the history,tying with Almaty 2017 which also had 85 events from 12 sports on its programme.This is the tying with Almaty 2017 which also had 85 events from 12 sports on its programme.This is  the penultimate edition edition that program consists of nine core sports,as Ski orienteering is scheduled to turn a core sport in 2027.Due the current FISU rules,speed ​​skating has a unique status within the FISU program it does not count as either a required or optional sport and when a city adds it as an optional sport it gains the right to add an extra optional sport. In the case of Lake Placid, the choice was for the Nordic combined,as ski jumping was planned as an optional sport.This also the first time on Games history that woman can compete on Nordic Combined.

Numbers in parentheses indicate the number of medal events contested in each sport.

Medal table
A total of 25 delegations won at least one medal. Thailand won the first ever medals in a Winter World University Games.

Schedule

Participating nations 
46 National University Sports Federations (NUSF)s registered a total of 1,443 athletes to compete in the games. Haiti made its Winter World University Games debut.

 
 
 
 
 
 
 
 
 
 
 
 
 
 
 
 
 
 
 
 
 
 
 
 
 
 
 
 
 
 
 
 
 
 
 
 
 
 
 
 
  Chinese Taipei (2)
 
 
 
  (Hosts)

Marketing

Mascot 
The official mascot of the Games—a moose named Adirondack Mac—was unveiled on November 14, 2021. Designed by Fashion Institute of Technology student Kristina Ingerowski, it was selected following a public vote and submission process, and named after the Adirondack Mountains.

Broadcasting 
In August 2022, it was announced that ESPN would hold the U.S. media rights to the Games, with coverage to be carried by ESPN2 and ESPNU. ESPN's partner TSN holds the Canadian media rights via this agreement. FISU.tv is the international broadcaster of the Games, but geo-blocked in USA and Canada.

References

External links

Event database

 
Winter World University Games
Winter World University Games
Winter multi-sport events in the United States
International sports competitions in New York (state)
Sports in Lake Placid, New York
Winter Universiade
Winter World University Games
Winter World University Games